All Saints Church is the United Reformed Church in Burgess Hill.  Originally a Congregational church, it replaced Burgess Hill's first Congregational chapel in Grove Road.  It was registered as Junction Road Church.

It is a Classical building with a large portico and columns — an unusual style for such a late construction date (1881).

John Betjeman thought it was the Burgess Hill's only decent piece of architecture.

The exterior was painted in 1986, and the pews were removed in 2001.

References

External links

Churches completed in 1881
United Reformed churches in Mid Sussex District
Congregational churches in Mid Sussex District
1881 establishments in England
Burgess Hill